The Singapore Food Festival is an annual event that takes place every year from the end of June to the end of July. It is organised by the Singapore Tourism Board. Composed of weekly core events, themed celebrations, culinary workshops, and competitions organised island-wide, this month-long festival celebrates the local perennial food favourites that have given Singapore an international reputation of a diverse food heaven.   In 2017 the theme was 'Savour Singapore in Every Bite.'    Some of the local features include: Hawker Wine Safari, Kueh Appreciation Day, the Singapore Tea Festival, the 50 Cents Fest and more.

References

External links 
 Singapore Food Festival Web Site

Festivals in Singapore